Dietmar Schwarz  (born 30 July 1947 in East Berlin) is a German coxswain who competed for the SC Dynamo Berlin / Sportvereinigung (SV) Dynamo. He won the medals at the international rowing competitions.

References

External links
 
 
 

1947 births
Living people
Rowers from Berlin
People from East Berlin
Olympic medalists in rowing
East German male rowers
Olympic rowers of East Germany
Olympic bronze medalists for East Germany
Medalists at the 1972 Summer Olympics
Coxswains (rowing)
Rowers at the 1972 Summer Olympics